Atlético Nacional is a professional Colombian football team based in Medellín. Considered to be one of the strongest clubs from Colombia, it is one of the most consistent clubs in the country. Atlético Nacional was founded in 1947 by Julio Ortiz, Jorge Osorio Cadavid, Jorge Gómez, Arturo Torres, Gilberto Molina, Alberto Eastman, Raúl Zapata Lotero and Luis Alberto Villegas Lopera.

This is a list of international competitions in which Atlético Nacional has played with its respective matches.

Performance in international competitions

Notes
 F: Finals
 FS: First stage
 GS: Group stage
 PO: Playoff
 PR: Preliminary round
 QF: Quarter-finals
 R16: Round of 16
 SF: Semi-finals
 SS: Second stage
 TP: Third-place playoff
 TS: Third stage

References

External links
CONMEBOL official website

Atlético Nacional